The 2014 SWAC men's basketball tournament took place March 11–15 at the Toyota Center in Houston, Texas.

Format
Ten teams participated in the 2014 tournament. Arkansas-Pine Bluff, Grambling State, Mississippi Valley State, and Southern University each received one-year postseason bans in men's basketball, thus were not allowed to participate in the 2014 SWAC Tournament, due to failing to meet the NCAA's APR requirements.

On March 1, 2014, the NCAA Selection Committee announced that the SWAC received a special exemption from the NCAA men's basketball selection committee to adjust which team earns its automatic berth to the tournament, All four ineligible teams will be allowed to play in the tourney due to only six teams being eligible. If one of the four ineligible teams wins the tournament, the team among the six eligible teams that advances the furthest in the tournament will receive the NCAA tournament bid. In the event of a tie (for example, all tournament-eligible teams are eliminated in the same round), the automatic berths will go to the highest-seeded team.  With all four ineligible teams being eliminated in the quarterfinals or before, this contingency was rendered moot, and the tournament winner received an automatic berth after all.

Schedule

*Game times in Central Time. #Rankings denote tournament seeding.

Bracket

* Ineligible for postseason play due to APR penalties

References

SWAC men's basketball tournament
2013–14 Southwestern Athletic Conference men's basketball season